is a river in Akita Prefecture, Japan. It originates from Mount Chōkai, where the border of Akita Prefecture and Yamagata Prefecture is located, and flows through Yurihonjō and finally into Sea of Japan. The headstream of the river is called . It has the third largest drainage area of the class A rivers that flow through Akita Prefecture, after Omono River and Yoneshiro River.

References 

Rivers of Akita Prefecture
Rivers of Japan